Lamela is a Hispanic surname that may refer to the following notable people:
Antonio Lamela (1926–2017), Spanish architect
Baldomero Lamela (1805–1867), Argentine soldier
Carlos Lamela (born 1957), Spanish architect, son of Antonio
Carmen Lamela (born 1961), Spanish judge
Erik Lamela (born 1992), Argentine football player
Joel Lamela (born 1971), Cuban sprinter 
Juan José Medina Lamela, Puerto Rico Adjutant General
Yago Lamela (1977–2014), Spanish long jumper
Zugey Lamela, Puerto Rican journalist and news presenter
Atabey Lamela, Puerto Rican federal attorney

See also
Lamelas (surname)

Spanish-language surnames